The Notre Dame Mountains are a portion of the Appalachian Mountains, extending from the Gaspé Peninsula of Quebec to the Green Mountains of Vermont.

The range runs from northeast to southwest, forming the southern edge of the St. Lawrence River valley, and following the Canada–United States border between Quebec and Maine. The mountainous New Brunswick "panhandle" is located in the Notre Dame range as well as the uppermost reaches of the Connecticut River valley in New Hampshire.

Etymology
Notre Dame is French for "Our Lady," a Catholic term referring to the Virgin Mary.

While on an expedition on 15 August 1535, Jacques Cartier wrote:  The jour Notre Dame d'aoust XVe refers to the feast of the Assumption of Mary, commemorated in the Catholic Church on 15 August. The following autumn, maps he authored carried the name "haultes montaignes de Honguedo." However, it was the title of "Notre Dame" that would propagate quickly throughout the 16th century, with French navigator Jean Alfonse referring to them as the "montz Nostre Dame" in his 1544 work Cosmographie, followed by Gerardus Mercator in 1569.

Geography

Topography
The Notre Dame Mountains are the principal subrange of the Appalachian Mountains in Quebec. Within Quebec, the range parallels the St. Lawrence River until its terminus at the eastern end of the Gaspé Peninsula. However, the southern limit of the range is the subject of some debate, though some sources consider either Lake Memphremagog or the US border as the southern edge of the Notre Dame Mountains.

The Chic-Choc Mountains are one of the primary subranges of the Notre Dame Mountains.

Geology

Conservation
The Notre Dame Mountains are protected by several parks, both federally by Parks Canada and provincially by the Quebec Sépaq and New Brunswick:

 Forillon National Park
 Bic National Park
 Frontenac National Park
 Lake Témiscouata National Park
 Gaspésie National Park
 Mount Carleton Provincial Park

See also
Notre Dame and Mégantic Mountains

References

 
Subranges of the Appalachian Mountains
Mountain ranges of Maine
Mountain ranges of New Hampshire
Mountain ranges of Quebec
Mountain ranges of Vermont
Mountain ranges of New Brunswick
North Maine Woods